Jahlil Tripp (born September 22, 1997) is an American professional basketball player who last played for the College Park Skyhawks of the NBA G League. He played college basketball for the South Plains Texans and the Pacific Tigers. Tripp plays now in Finland, Tapiolan Honka

High school career
Tripp played basketball for Brooklyn Collegiate High School in Brooklyn, New York. On December 4, 2013, while returning home from a girls basketball game with his teammates, he was hit in his calf by a stray bullet. He underwent surgery and was able to continue playing in under one month. Two games after his return, Tripp broke his left leg, underwent surgery again and missed the rest of his junior season. As a senior, he transferred to Abraham Lincoln High School in Brooklyn, averaging 17 points and 11 rebounds per game. Tripp's request for a fifth year of eligibility, due to his injuries during his junior season, was denied by the Public Schools Athletic League. Shortly before his graduation, he committed to play college basketball for Rutgers but reopened his recruitment after a coaching change. However, he did not receive more NCAA Division I offers, as it was late in the recruiting process, and decided to play for South Plains College, whose coach Steve Green knew one of Tripp's former high school coaches.

College career
As a freshman, Tripp was the starting power forward for South Plains College. His team, which was the highest ranked junior college team in the country, was modeled after the 2016–17 Golden State Warriors, with Tripp playing the role of the Warriors' Draymond Green. He averaged 11.4 points, 6.7 rebounds and 2.2 assists per game and was named to the All-Western Junior College Athletic Conference Team. Tripp was recruited to Pacific by head coach Damon Stoudamire, who spotted him while scouting his South Plains teammate Roberto Gallinat. As a sophomore at Pacific, Tripp sometimes played the point guard position, even though he usually played small forward. On November 18, 2017, he set season-highs of 24 points and 15 rebounds in an 89–74 loss to Nevada. In his sophomore season, Tripp averaged 10.9 points, 7.8 rebounds, 4.5 assists and 1.5 steals per game and was named to the Second Team All-West Coast Conference (WCC). 

As a junior, he was Pacific's only player to start in all 32 games. He averaged 10.6 points, 5.7 rebounds, three assists and 1.6 steals per game and was an All-WCC Honorable Mention selection. On January 4, 2020, Tripp scored a career-high 39 points and grabbed 11 rebounds in a 107–99 quadruple overtime win over Saint Mary's. He reached 1,000 career points against Santa Clara on January 18, 2020, finishing with 28 points in a 84–80 loss. As a senior, Tripp averaged 16.2 points, 8.9 rebounds, two assists and 1.5 steals per game, earning First Team All-WCC and WCC Defensive Player of the Year honors. He led the WCC in double-doubles, registering 11, and total rebounds. Tripp received the Pacific Athletics Four Pillars Award, which is given annually to a student-athlete who exemplifies the four core identities of family, balance, winning spirit and innovation.

Professional career

Memphis Hustle (2020–2021)
After going unselected in the 2020 NBA draft, Tripp was signed by the Memphis Grizzlies to an Exhibit 10 deal. He was waived at the conclusion of training camp and subsequently added to the Grizzlies' NBA G League affiliate the Memphis Hustle.

On October 23, 2021, Tripp re-signed with the Hustle. He was waived on November 3, as part of the final roster cuts.

Maine Celtics (2021)
On December 19, 2021, Tripp signed with the Maine Celtics. However, he was waived three days later, after two appearances.

College Park Skyhawks (2021–2022)
On December 22, 2021, Tripp was claimed off waivers by the College Park Skyhawks. Tripp was then later waived on February 28, 2022.

Career statistics

College

NCAA Division I

|-
| style="text-align:left;"| 2017–18
| style="text-align:left;"| Pacific
| 32 || 31 || 35.1 || .445 || .315 || .656 || 7.8 || 4.5 || 1.5 || .2 || 10.9
|-
| style="text-align:left;"| 2018–19
| style="text-align:left;"| Pacific
| 32 || 32 || 29.6 || .506 || .316 || .694 || 5.7 || 3.0 || 1.6 || .1 || 10.6
|-
| style="text-align:left;"| 2019–20
| style="text-align:left;"| Pacific
| 33 || 33 || 30.7 || .512 || .156 || .712 || 8.9 || 2.0 || 1.5 || .1 || 16.2
|- class="sortbottom"
| style="text-align:center;" colspan="2"| Career
| 97 || 96 || 31.8 || .489 || .269 || .692 || 7.5 || 3.2 || 1.5 || .1 || 12.6

JUCO

|-
| style="text-align:left;"| 2016–17
| style="text-align:left;"| South Plains
| 34 || 30 || 18.4 || .540 || .333 || .598 || 6.7 || 2.2 || 1.1 || .1 || 11.4

References

External links
Pacific Tigers bio
South Plains Texans bio

1997 births
Living people
American men's basketball players
Basketball players from New York City
College Park Skyhawks players
Maine Celtics players
Memphis Hustle players
Pacific Tigers men's basketball players
Power forwards (basketball)
Small forwards
South Plains Texans basketball players
Sportspeople from Brooklyn